Karl-Josef Rauber (born 11 April 1934) is a cardinal of the Catholic Church, who served as a papal nuncio from 1982 until his retirement in 2009.

Biography
After graduating from St.-Michaels-Gymnasium of Metten Abbey in 1950, Rauber studied Catholic theology and philosophy at the University of Mainz. On 28 February 1959, he was ordained in Mainz Cathedral by Bishop Albert Stohr. He was a chaplain in Nidda and in 1962 earned a doctoral degree in canon law at the Pontifical Gregorian University in Rome. At the same time, he attended the Pontifical Ecclesiastical Academy. At the State Secretariat beginning in 1966, Rauber was one of four secretaries of the Substitute of the Secretariat of State, Archbishop Giovanni Benelli. He was primarily responsible for the German-speaking territories. Pope Paul VI awarded him on 22 December 1976 the title of Honorary Prelate of His Holiness. In 1977 he was Nuntiaturrat in Belgium and Luxembourg and 1981 in Greece.

On 18 December 1982, Pope John Paul II appointed him Titular Archbishop of Iubaltiana and pro-nuncio to Uganda. Pope John Paul II also consecrated him as bishop on 6 January 1983. Co-consecrators were the ex officio in the Vatican Secretariat of State, Eduardo Martínez Somalo and the Secretary of the Congregation for the Evangelization of Peoples, Duraisamy Simon Lourdusamy. His motto is "Caritas Christi urget nos" (The love of Christ drives us).

On 22 January 1990, Pope John Paul II appointed Rauber President of the Pontifical Ecclesiastical Academy, a post he held until 16 March 1993. In 1991, he was assigned to investigate the problems encountered in the Diocese of Chur by Bishop Wolfgang Haas. He returned to the diplomatic service of the Holy See when he was named Apostolic Nuncio to Switzerland on 16 March 1993 and to Liechtenstein on 17 April 1993. His next appointment was on 25 April 1997 as Apostolic Nuncio to Hungary and Moldova. On 22 February 2003 he was named Apostolic Nuncio to Belgium and Luxembourg. When the Church leadership in Rome passed over his recommendation of three candidates for the position of Archbishop of Mechelen-Brussels and  Pope Benedict XVI named André-Joseph Léonard to the position instead, Rauber objected publicly and described Léonard as wholly unsuited for the appointment.

Pope Benedict XVI accepted his resignation for reasons of age in 2009.

On 4 January 2015, Pope Francis announced that he would make him a cardinal on 14 February. At that ceremony, he was created Cardinal-Deacon of the titular church of Sant'Antonio di Padova a Circonvallazione Appia.

See also
Cardinals created by Pope Francis
 List of heads of the diplomatic missions of the Holy See

References

External links
 

1934 births
Living people
21st-century German cardinals
Cardinals created by Pope Francis
Pontifical Ecclesiastical Academy alumni
Presidents of the Pontifical Ecclesiastical Academy
Apostolic Nuncios to Luxembourg
Apostolic Nuncios to Belgium
Apostolic Nuncios to Hungary
Apostolic Nuncios to Moldova
Apostolic Nuncios to Switzerland
Apostolic Nuncios to Liechtenstein
Roman Catholic titular archbishops
Apostolic Nuncios to Uganda
Knights Commander of the Order of Merit of the Federal Republic of Germany
Clergy from Nuremberg